Jamilhio Rigters (born 11 November 1999) is a Surinamese professional footballer who plays as a left-wing for SVB Eerste Divisie club Robinhood and the Suriname national team.

International career
Rigters made his senior international debut on 28 January 2022 in a friendly against Barbados, scoring his first goal in the eventual 1–0 victory. Four days later he scored Suriname's two goals  in a victory over Guyana in his second cap.

International goals
Scores and results list Suriname's goal tally first.

International career statistics

Honours 
West United

 SVB Cup runner-up: 2017–18

Robinhood

 Caribbean Club Shield winner: 2019

References

External links
National Football Teams profile

1999 births
Living people
Surinamese footballers
Association football midfielders
S.V. Robinhood players
F.C. West United players
SVB Eerste Divisie players
Suriname youth international footballers
Suriname under-20 international footballers
Suriname international footballers